This annotated bibliography is intended to list both notable and not so notable works of English language, non-fiction and fiction related to the sport of fly fishing listed by year published. Although 100% of any book listed is not necessarily devoted to fly fishing, all these titles have significant fly fishing content. Included in this bibliography is a list of fly tying, fly tackle, regional guides, memoirs, stories and fly fishing fiction related literature.
 For readability, the bibliography is contained in three separate lists. For classic general texts, history of fly fishing and fly fishing library collections see: Bibliography of fly fishing
 For species related fly fishing literature see: Bibliography of fly fishing (species related)

Annotations

Annotations may reflect descriptive comments from the book's dust jacket, third party reviews or personal, descriptive and qualitative comments by individuals who have read the book. Some older works have links to online versions in the Internet Archive or Google Books.

Fly tying and patterns

19th century
 
 , reprinted in 1855
 
 

 
 
 
 , According to Dr. Andrew Herd in The Fly, Pritt's work was the first comprehensive attempt to codify the completely different North Country school of fly tying using soft hackle wet flies.

20th century

1900–1940s

1950–1970s
 
 *  New Naturalist #23
 
 
 
 
 
 
 
 
 
 
 , introduction by Charles K. Fox, illustrations by the author, 8 color plates and numerous b/w photographs by Irv Swope, index.
 
 
 
 , the year is divided into two seasonsthe season for tying flies and the season for angling with them. Sam Slaymaker writes with equal relish about tying flies by the fireplace and trying them out on the stream.
 
 , a comprehensive period guide to tying bugs and flies for bass. Very well illustrated.

1980–1990s
 
 
 
 
 
 , one of the most comprehensive treatments of techniques for tying all types of flies for commercial quality.
 
 
 
 , Loaded with color photographs and descriptions of the natural materials such as fur, hair and feathers used in fly tying.* 
 
 , begins with comparisons between subsurface flies and the insects they resemble. Complete materials lists and step-by-step instructions for tying soft-hackled flies, wingless wets, traditional winged wets, and fuzzy nymphs are included.

21st century

2000–2009
 
 
 , revised 2019
 
 
 
 
 
 
 , everything you wanted to know about fishing and tying Woolly Worms, Woolly Buggers and the like. The comprehensive reference on the subject.
 
 , the comprehensive treatment of tying and fishing the Clouser Minnow by the inventor of the fly, Bob Clouser.

2010–2020

Fly fishing entomology and other prey studies
 
 
 
 , Jennings was probably the first American Fly Fishing writer to tie the entomology of trout stream insects to the artificial flies and how to fish them in this 1935 seminal work.
 , Matching The Hatch was the first American book to cover fly imitation from a transcontinental perspective and is widely read and reprinted. According to Paul Schullery, Matching The Hatch set the standard for fly entomology and tying studies for the late 20th Century.

Fly fishing anthologies
 
 
 , contains a useful bibliography entitled Angling Writers & Their Works
 , contains 30 stories by many noted American anglers including: La Branche, Connett, Hewitt, Bergman and Jennings. Angler's Choice is considered by Arnold Gingrich as the first American fishing anthology devoted solely to trout.
 
 
 , American Trout Fishing is the trade press edition of the Gordon Garland, a compilation of stories and history about American Trout fishing and is dedicated to Theodore Gordon. Noted fly fishing authorsLee Wulff, Roderick Haig Brown, Ernie Schwiebert, Dana Lamb, Joe Brooks and many other contributed to this work.
 , loaded with outstanding essays, stories and poems by many of the greats in the sport to include: George Anderson, Russell Chatham, John Holt, Nick Lyons, Datus Proper and Charles Waterman.

Fly fishing stories and memoirs
 , a man of immense social standing, the Reverend Van Dyke's Fishersman's Luck is a classic of Victorian recreational literature-John Schullery
 
 
 
 
 

 , one of Lamb's early works, stories telling in lyric style about Atlantic Salmon fishing.
 

 , one of many books by lyric fly-fishing writer Dana Lambs. Where Pools Are Bright and Deep is another great piece of fly-fishing poetry and story telling.
 , a classic by Canadian author Haig-Brown first published in 1946.
 , Beneath the Rising Mist is a collection of stories and articles written by a top lyric fishing writer, Dana Lamb. Most of the stories are about Atlantic Salmon fishing.
 , a comprehensive look at a Fly Fishing legend: Dan Bailey and his evolution into one of the most well known fly shop owners in Montana.
 , Trout Bum is Gierach's first and best book.

 
 
 , For anyone who loves fly-fishing or is looking to begin, John Gierach offers an entertaining view of the sport. Written in a series of witty essays that are inspiring, humorous, and educational, this book will transport you to real rivers and lakes in the company of one of the great writers of fly-fishing literature.,.
 
 
 , this is the 1996 reprint of Charles Ritz (Ritz Hotels) 1959 memoir of his fly-fishing experiences. A fascinating read. Acknowledged as one of the great classics on the art of fly fishing. In 1973, Arnold Gingrich in Joys of Trout calls A Fly Fishers Life one of the top thirty outstanding fishing books printed since 1496.
 
 
 , foreword by Ted Leeson. Based on the author's columns in Gray's Sporting Journal. Begins "Oh my. Another collection of navel-gazing essays from a baby boomer who got hold of a fly rod and a word processor and thought Eureka, I've found myself. And wants to share."
  Posthumously published journal of his flying and fly-fishing off the coasts of Labrador and Newfoundland in the 1940s and 1950s.
 , an urban angler reveals a surprising fact: good fishingand adventurecan be found a bike ride away within the city limits of the nation's first capital. A tale told in poetic prose, this is a practical, lyrical, all-American fish story.
 , author Richard Landerman takes random, everyday musings and weaves them together with humor and substance using the common thread of fly fishing. A great read that most baby-boomers will identify with

Fly fishing poetry

Fly fishing humor
 , a compilation of short stories first published by Corey Ford in Field and Stream. Jokingly labeled: The Minutes of the Lower Forty Shooting, Angling and Inside Straight Club.

Fly fishing art and artists
 , Schaldach was an artist-angler. This work contains 60 reproductions of his art. Many of his illustrations adorned other Fly Fishing literature, to include fly fishing articles in Esquire magazine.
 , Brayshaw was a conservation minded angler in British Columbia who is best known for his illustration of Roderick Haig Brown books. Contains twenty-two color plates and 28 inked drawings

Fly fishing fiction
 , Annie Trumbull Slosson (1838–1926) was an important short story writer who epitomized the American local color movement that flourished after the Civil War and ended at the beginning of the twentieth century.

 , Dud Dean stories about angling, hunting and camping in the wilds of Maine.
 , The Guide and the CEO us a superbly told story about the relationship that develops between a trout bum-guide and a hard-as-nails Wall Street mogul.

Geographic, regional and specific waters fly fishing guides
 
 , memoirs of Howard Back's two visits to Yellowstone National Park in 1936 and 1937. Wonderful insights into what fly fishing the park was like in the 1930s. Reprinted in 2000.
 , a very descriptive work of the Golden Trout waters of the southern Sierra Nevada Mountains in California.
 
 , interesting chapters on fly tying for Northwest trout, fly-fishing for Steelhead, Salmon, Sea-run Cutthroat trout and Shad.
 
 , this is an excellent source of information for fly fishing in Yellowstone National Park. An extensive amount of information, combined with detailed hatch information, makes this a great guidebook to have for anyone planning on fly fishing in Yellowstone National Park.
 
 
 
 
 , probably the most comprehensive work every published on fishing the Yellowstone River from the park waters all the way to Big Timber.
 
 , comprehensive, stream by stream guide to fly fishing in Eastern Montana. Contains extensive descriptions of tributaries and secondary waters.
 
 , from a wade through the chilly waters of early April to his last muddy trek in late October, Mike Sajna remembers the days in one season of America's oldest sportfly fishing. His territory: the streams, dams and runs of the three major river systems in Pennsylvaniathe Ohio, the Susquehanna, and the Delaware.

 , a very nicely written, comprehensive but concise guide to fly-fishing the upper Arkansas River from Leadville to Royal Gorge Colorado.

Fly rods and fly casting
 
 
 
 
 , illustrated fly casting guide by Winner of National, Great Lakes, Midwest, Michigan and New York Fly Casting Championships.
 
 
 , Noted angling author John Gierach's musings about Bamboo fly rodswhy he fishes and collects them.

References

Fly fishing literature
Fly fishing
Recreational fishing-related lists